Ponnu Velayira Bhoomi is a 1998 Indian Tamil-language comedy drama film directed by K. Krishnan. The film stars Rajkiran, Khushbu and Vineetha, with Manivannan, Vadivelu, R. Sundarrajan, Vennira Aadai Moorthy, Vittal Rao and Latha in supporting roles. It was released on 10 April 1998.

Plot

Palanisamy (Rajkiran) is a kind-hearted rich farmer and he soon becomes the village chief. Palanisamy is known in his village for holding demonstrations. The poor village girl Valli (Vineetha) falls in love with Palanisamy until Valli knows that Palanisamy is in fact married to Pushpa (Khushbu) who is mentally ill.

In the past, Pushpa was an arrogant english-medium school owner. She first clashed with Palanisamy, then they fell in love with each other. On a misunderstanding, they get married and they lived happily together. Pushpa's father (Vittal Rao) wanted to take revenge on Palanisamy. During her childbirth, Pushpa's newborn baby died and Pushpa couldn't get pregnant again. Just after this incident, Pushpa became mentally ill.

Valli decides to take care of Pushpa. Later, at the village court, Valli claims that Palanisamy married her. In the meantime, Pushpa becomes again as she was and the upset Pushpa goes back to her parents. Palanisamy feels lost.

Meanwhile, the farmers have been scammed by a vicious businessman (Manivannan) and Pushpa's father. Palanisamy recovers the farmers' properties and ultimately saves Pushpa's father from the angry farmers. Pushpa then reveals to Palanisamy that she wanted to see Palanisamy having a baby so she plans everything with Valli's help. Palanisamy and Valli forgive Pushpa. Palanisamy and Pushpa live happily ever after.

Cast

Rajkiran as Palanisamy
Khushbu as Pushpa
Vineetha as Valli
Manivannan as Businessman
Vadivelu as Amavasai
R. Sundarrajan as Arumugam
Vennira Aadai Moorthy
Vittal Rao as Pushpa's father
Latha as Pushpa's mother
Vaani as Valli's mother
Vichithra
Shakeela
Idichapuli Selvaraj
Vaiyapuri
Vijayamma
Sekhar
Pollachi Sukumaran
Ravichandran
Ramakrishna Iyer
MLA Thangaraj

Production
The film took over a year to make, and had a delayed release.

Soundtrack

The film score and the soundtrack were composed by Deva. The soundtrack, released in 1998, features 5 tracks with lyrics written by Vaali.

References

1998 films
1990s Tamil-language films
Films scored by Deva (composer)